Mahto is an unincorporated community in Corson County, in the U.S. state of South Dakota.

History
A post office called Mahto was established in 1909, and remained in operation until 1963. Mahto is a name derived from the Sioux language meaning "bear".

References

Unincorporated communities in Corson County, South Dakota
Unincorporated communities in South Dakota